Hugh Westwood (by 1500 – 1559), of Chedworth, Gloucestershire, was an English politician.

Family
There is no information on Westwood's ancestry. At some point by 1521, he married a woman named Agnes. At some point in 1544 or after, he married Jane née Baynham, a daughter of Sir Alexander Baynham of Westbury-on-Severn, the widow of Robert Wye of Lipyeate, Somerset. He is not recorded to have had any legitimate children, but had one illegitimate son.

Career
He was a Member (MP) of the Parliament of England for Wootton Bassett in 1545.

References

1559 deaths
English MPs 1545–1547
People from Cotswold District
Year of birth uncertain